Sai Tirupati University  is a Private university located in  Udaipur, Rajasthan, India.It was founded in 2016.

References

External links

Universities and colleges in  Udaipur
Universities in Rajasthan
Private universities in India
2016 establishments in Rajasthan
Educational institutions established in 2016